Zyuratkul National Park is a Russian national park established in 1993 in the southern part of Satkinsky Raion (Chelyabinsk Oblast, Urals).  The park lies about 30 km south of Satka and 200 km west of Chelyabinsk.

Description
Notable features include Zyuratkul lake, a rare mountainous body of water for the Urals 754 m above sea level, with a surface area of 13,2 km2 and a maximum depth of 8 m. Water is slightly mineralised (≈50 mg/L). Because of its clear water and spectacular landscape around, Zyuratkul' is often called "Ural Ritsa".

Also remarkable is a number of mountain ranges, among them Zyuratkul' range (8 km in length, rising 1175 m in its highest point).  Another range, Nurgush, is the highest point of Chelyabinsk Oblast with a height of 1406 m.

See also
 Southern Ural
 Zyuratkul Geoglyph

References

External links

National parks of Russia
Protected areas established in 1993
Mountain ranges of Russia
Geography of Chelyabinsk Oblast
Landforms of Chelyabinsk Oblast
Tourist attractions in Chelyabinsk Oblast